Malir Railway Station (Sindhi: ملير ريلوي اسٽيشن) is located in Malir 15, Karachi, Pakistan.

See also
 Malir Cantonment railway station
 Malir Colony railway station
 List of railway stations in Pakistan
 Pakistan Railways

References

External links

Railway stations in Karachi
Railway stations on Karachi Circular Railway